Dermot Flanagan is a former Gaelic footballer who played for the Mayo county team and received two All Stars awards. He is the son of Irish Minister and Mayo Gaelic footballer Seán Flanagan.

Playing career
Dermot Flanagan began playing for the Mayo Minor team in 1979. He played with the Mayo Senior team for 15 years from 1982–1997. During his Senior career, he won seven Connacht titles.

Flanagan received All Star awards in 1985 and 1989. He is Mayo's second most-capped player (after James Nallen) with 122 appearances.

References

Living people
Irish barristers
Mayo inter-county Gaelic footballers
Year of birth missing (living people)